Brock Christopher Burke (born August 4, 1996) is an American professional baseball pitcher for the Texas Rangers of Major League Baseball (MLB). He made his MLB debut in 2019.

Career

Amateur career
Burke attended Evergreen High School in Evergreen, Colorado. In his senior year, he struck out 20 batters in a game against Eaglecrest High School at Coors Field. He committed to attend the University of Oregon.

Tampa Bay Rays
The Rays selected him in the third round, with the 96th overall selection, of the 2014 MLB draft. He signed for an above slot $897,500 signing bonus. He made his professional debut in 2014 for the Gulf Coast Rays, going 0–3 with a 10.80 ERA in  innings pitched. Burke spent 2015 with the Princeton Rays where he went 4–2 with a 3.42 ERA in 11 starts, and 2016 with the Hudson Valley Renegades where he pitched to a 3–3 record and a 3.39 ERA in 13 starts.

Burke began the 2017 season with the Bowling Green Hot Rods, and was promoted to the Charlotte Stone Crabs during the season. In 23 starts between the two teams, he went 11–6 with a 2.99 ERA. In 2018, he pitched for both Charlotte and the Montgomery Biscuits, compiling a combined 9–6 record and 3.08 ERA 25 games (22 starts). The Rays added Burke to their 40-man roster after the 2018 season.

Texas Rangers
On December 21, 2018, the Texas Rangers acquired Burke from the Rays as part of a three team deal in which the Rangers also acquired Kyle Bird, Yoel Espinal, Eli White, and $750,000 of international signing bonus pool space, the Rays acquired Emilio Pagan, Rollie Lacy, and a competitive balance pick in the 2019 MLB draft (Seth Johnson), and the Oakland Athletics acquired Jurickson Profar.

In 2019, Burke was optioned to the Frisco RoughRiders of the Double-A Texas League to open the season. Burke was placed on the injured list on April 23 due to shoulder fatigue and blister issues. He made one start each for the AZL Rangers and the Hickory Crawdads, before returning to Frisco on June 26. With Frisco, he went 3–5 with a 3.18 ERA in 45 innings. On August 6, Burke was promoted to the Nashville Sounds of the Triple-A Pacific Coast League. He made two starts for Nashville, allowing 7 runs over 8 innings.

On August 20, 2019, the Rangers promoted Burke to the major leagues. He made his major league debut that night versus the Los Angeles Angels, recording four strikeouts over six scoreless innings. With Texas in 2019, Burke went 0–2 with a 7.43 ERA over  innings. Burke missed the entire 2020 season, after undergoing surgery to repair a torn labrum in his left shoulder in February 2020. Burke spent 2021 season with the Round Rock Express of the Triple-A West, going 1–5 with a 5.68 ERA and 97 strikeouts over  innings.  

Burke made the Rangers 2022 Opening Day roster as a relief pitcher. Burke's 2022 season was a breakout in performance and health. He posted a 7–5 record with a 1.97 ERA and 90 strikeouts over  innings. He was named the Texas Rangers Rookie of the Year by the DFW area BBWAA.

Personal life
Burke has suffered from somnambulism (sleepwalking) his entire life. On multiple occasions while in the minor leagues, Burke was witnessed by different roommates waking up suddenly during the night and acting out in various ways.

References

External links

1996 births
Living people
People from Evergreen, Colorado
Baseball players from Chicago
Major League Baseball pitchers
Texas Rangers players
Gulf Coast Rays players
Princeton Rays players
Hudson Valley Renegades players
Bowling Green Hot Rods players
Charlotte Stone Crabs players
Montgomery Biscuits players
Arizona League Rangers players
Hickory Crawdads players
Frisco RoughRiders players
Nashville Sounds players
Round Rock Express players